Aspergillus sojae is a species of fungus in the genus Aspergillus.

In Japan, it is used to make the ferment (kōji) of soy sauce, miso, mirin, and other lacto-fermented condiments such as tsukemono. Soy sauce condiment is produced by fermenting soybeans with A. sojae, along with water and salt.

Glyceollins, molecules belonging to the pterocarpans, are found in the soybean (Glycine max) and have been found to have an antifungal activity against A. sojae.

Aspergillus sojae contains 10 glutaminase genes. The glutaminase enzyme in A. sojae is important to the taste of the soy sauce that it produces.

An experiment was conducted using the  genome sequencing of A. sojae. Strain NBRC 4239  had been  isolated from the koji used to prepare Japanese soy sauce. The sequencing technology was used to  investigate the genome with respect to enzymes and secondary metabolites in comparison with other Aspergillus species sequenced.  The A. sojae NBRC4239 genome data will be useful to characterize functional features of the koji molds used in Japanese industries.

See also 
 Akira Endo
 Aspergillus oryzae
 Medicinal molds
 Rhizopus oligosporus

References 

sojae
Fungi described in 1971
Molds used in food production